Aaron Daniel Wiggins (born January 2, 1999) is an American professional basketball player for the Oklahoma City Thunder of the National Basketball Association (NBA). He played college basketball for the Maryland Terrapins.

Early life and high school career
Wiggins grew up playing basketball, football and running track. Through his childhood, he played the piano and trombone, acted in plays and danced. Wiggins played basketball for Grimsley High School in Greensboro, North Carolina before transferring to Wesleyan Christian Academy in High Point, North Carolina. As a senior, he was an NCISAA Class 3A All-State selection. Wiggins competed for Team Charlotte on the Amateur Athletic Union circuit. A consensus four-star recruit, he committed to play college basketball for Maryland on June 3, 2017. He had drawn the attention of Maryland's coaching staff while they were visiting Wesleyan to watch his teammate Jaylen Hoard.

College career
Wiggins began his freshman season as a starter, but later told coach Mark Turgeon that he was more comfortable coming off the bench. As a freshman at Maryland, he played the most minutes among his team's reserves. He led Maryland with a season-high 15 points in losses to Michigan and Michigan State. He finished the season averaging 8.3 points and 3.3 rebounds in 23.5 minutes per game, shooting a team-high 41.3 percent from three-point range. On February 23, 2020, Wiggins scored a sophomore season-high 20 points, recording six three-pointers, in a 79–72 loss to Ohio State. As a sophomore, he averaged 10.4 points, 4.9 rebounds and 1.4 assists per game and was named Big Ten Sixth Man of the Year. In the final game of his junior season, Wiggins scored a career-high 27 points in a 96–77 loss to Alabama at the second round of the NCAA tournament. As a junior, he averaged 14.5 points, 5.8 rebounds and 2.5 assists per game, earning All-Big Ten honorable mention. On April 9, 2021, Wiggins declared for the 2021 NBA draft while maintaining his college eligibility. He later decided to remain in the draft.

Professional career

Oklahoma City Thunder (2021–present) 
Wiggins was selected in the second round of the 2021 NBA draft with the 55th pick by the Oklahoma City Thunder. Wiggins had a very productive NBA Summer League with the Thunder averaging the second most points on the team with 11.2 PPG.  On August 15, 2021, he signed a two-way contract with the Thunder. Under the terms of the deal, he split time between the Thunder and their NBA G League affiliate, the Oklahoma City Blue. On December 26, 2021, Wiggins scored a career-high 24 points against the New Orleans Pelicans. He shot 8 for 10 from the field and 2 for 4 from three in Thunder's 117–112 win. On February 12, 2022, the Thunder converted Wiggins two-way contract into a standard NBA deal.

Career statistics

NBA

|-
| style="text-align:left;"| 
| style="text-align:left;"| Oklahoma City
| 50 || 35 || 24.2 || .463 || .304 || .729 || 3.6 || 1.4 || .6 || .2 || 8.3
|- class="sortbottom"
| style="text-align:center;" colspan="2"| Career
| 50 || 35 || 24.2 || .463 || .304 || .729 || 3.6 || 1.4 || .6 || .2 || 8.3

College

|-
| style="text-align:left;"| 2018–19
| style="text-align:left;"| Maryland
| 34 || 4 || 23.5 || .385 || .413 || .867 || 3.3 || .8 || .8 || .2 || 8.3
|-
| style="text-align:left;"| 2019–20
| style="text-align:left;"| Maryland
| 31 || 16 || 28.6 || .377 || .317 || .717 || 4.9 || 1.4 || .8 || .4 || 10.4
|-
| style="text-align:left;"| 2020–21
| style="text-align:left;"| Maryland
| 31 || 30 || 33.0 || .446 || .356 || .772 || 5.8 || 2.5 || 1.1 || .5 || 14.5
|- class="sortbottom"
| style="text-align:center;" colspan="2"| Career
| 96 || 50 || 28.2 || .407 || .361 || .769 || 4.6 || 1.6 || .9 || .4 || 11.0

References

External links
Maryland Terrapins bio

1999 births
Living people
American men's basketball players
Basketball players from Greensboro, North Carolina
Maryland Terrapins men's basketball players
Oklahoma City Blue players
Oklahoma City Thunder draft picks
Oklahoma City Thunder players
Shooting guards
Small forwards
Grimsley High School alumni